In mathematical physics, the twistor correspondence is a natural isomorphism between massless Yang–Mills fields on Minkowski space and sheaf cohomology classes on a real hypersurface of CP3.

Mathematical physics